The following offices were up for election in the United States Commonwealth of Virginia in the November 2009 general election:

Three statewide offices – Governor, Lieutenant Governor, Attorney General – for four-year terms
Virginia House of Delegates, the lower house of the Virginia General Assembly (100 seats), for two-year terms
Four local constitutional officers each in the larger independent cities – Sheriff, Commonwealth's Attorney, Treasurer, Commissioner of the Revenue – for four-year terms

Schedule of election related events
The Virginia State Board of Elections set the following calendar of events for the November 2009 election:

March 11 – Deadline for political party officials to request primary elections from the State Board of Elections
April 10 – Filing deadline for primary election candidates
May 11 – Voter registration deadline for primary election
June 2 – Application deadline for primary election mail-in absentee ballot
June 6 – Application deadline for primary election in-person absentee ballot
June 9 – Primary elections; deadline for parties to select candidates by non-primary methods; filing deadline for independent candidates
October 5 – Voter registration deadline for general election
October 27 – Application deadline for general election mail-in absentee ballot
October 31 – Application deadline for general election in-person absentee ballot
November 3 – General election

In addition, candidates must file campaign finance reports with the state or local election boards at certain specified intervals during the campaign year. The three incumbent statewide officeholders and members of the General Assembly are barred by law from fundraising during the annual session of the General Assembly, from mid-January through roughly the end of February.

Sufficiently large political parties (in practice, the Democratic and Republican parties) have the option of nominating candidates in primary elections. Nominees not chosen in primaries are selected in a caucus or convention process. Incumbent members of Congress and the General Assembly have the option of choosing their party's nominating method for their office; otherwise, the decision is made by a committee of party officials from the jurisdiction involved.

Persons 18 years old or older on the general election date (born on or before November 3, 1991) may register and vote in both the primary and general elections. Voters in Virginia do not register by party; they have the option of voting in any one party's primary, and may switch at will from one election to the next.

Issues

Reapportionment

In 2011 the General Assembly will redraw district boundaries for seats in the United States House of Representatives, the Senate of Virginia, and the House of Delegates, based on results of the 2010 United States Census. This is a highly partisan process, which can determine the balance of power in those bodies for up to ten years. There are three major players in the process:

Senate – barring unforeseen circumstances, the current senators will still be in office in 2011. Democrats had a 22-18 majority.
House of Delegates – Republicans had a 53-45 majority before the election, with 2 independents who caucused with the Republicans. The 2009 election determined control in 2011.
Governor – the incumbent, Democrat Tim Kaine, is not allowed to serve successive terms.

Governor

Party nominees
The Republican Party formally nominated former Attorney General Bob McDonnell of Virginia Beach, who was unopposed for the nomination, at the May 29–30 state party convention. McDonnell resigned as Virginia's Attorney General on February 3, 2009, to concentrate on the gubernatorial campaign.
The Democratic Party nominated Creigh Deeds, Democrat from Bath County – senator since 2002 following 10 years in the House; unsuccessful Democratic nominee for attorney general in 2005, after he captured the nomination in the Democratic Primary on June 9, 2009

Former candidates for the Democratic Party nomination
Terry McAuliffe, Democrat from Fairfax County – political consultant, former Democratic National Committee chair, recently Presidential campaign manager for Hillary Clinton; created a campaign committee on November 11, 2008
Brian Moran, Democrat from Alexandria – 7 term House member and House Democratic caucus chair; younger brother of U.S. Representative Jim Moran. Resigned from House of Delegates December 12, 2008 to concentrate on campaign

Lieutenant governor

Party nominees
Former state Secretary of Finance Jody Wagner, who resigned her position on August 8, 2008 to run, won the June 9 primary to be the Democratic Party nominee. Previously she was the unsuccessful Democratic candidate in Virginia's 2nd congressional district in 2000.
The Republican Party nominated incumbent Lt. Governor and former State Senator Bill Bolling of Hanover County at the party's May 29–30 convention.

Former candidates
 Jon Bowerbank, a Democratic energy industry engineer/entrepreneur, won election to the Russell County Board of Supervisors in November 2007 and began campaigning for lieutenant governor in May 2008. After getting his name on the primary ballot, Bowerbank withdrew on May 15, 2009, endorsing Wagner.
 Pat Edmonson, a Virginia Beach School Board member, announced her candidacy for the Democratic nomination on January 12, 2009, saying voters were "ready for a progressive voice" She failed to file the proper candidate paperwork with the state by the April 10, 2009 deadline, making her ineligible for the primary,
 Patrick C. Muldoon of Giles County, an unsuccessful Republican nominee in Virginia's 9th congressional district in 1996, filed on November 11, 2008, but lost the convention vote to Bolling.
 Rich Savage, a Democratic professional campaign consultant from Richmond, announced his candidacy on January 2, 2009 but suspended his campaign on March 6, citing financial pressures caused by the worsening economy.
Mike Signer of Arlington, a former deputy counselor to Mark Warner on Homeland Security and National Guard policy and senior strategist for Tom Perriello, lost the June 9 Democratic primary to Wagner.

Election results

Democratic primary
Official results :

General election

Polling

Democratic primary

General election

Attorney general

Party nominees
The Democratic Party nominee is State Delegate and former assistant Commonwealth's Attorney Steve Shannon of Fairfax County. Shannon announced his candidacy in the fall of 2008, and as the only candidate who filed for the Democratic primary, became the Democratic nominee by default.
The Republican Party nominee is State Senator Ken Cuccinelli of Fairfax County; Cuccinelli announced April 1, 2008, and won the nomination at the May 29–30 Republican convention.
Both candidates, Cuccinelli (Class of 1986) and Shannon (Class of 1989), attended Gonzaga College High School in Washington, D.C.

Former candidates
John L. Brownlee of Roanoke is a former United States Attorney for the Western District of Virginia who resigned on May 16, 2008 to run for the Republican Party nomination, but lost the convention vote to Cuccinelli.
John Fishwick, an attorney from Roanoke and unsuccessful 1992 Democratic candidate for the United States House of Representatives, set up a committee to run for the Democratic nomination in October 2008 but withdrew on January 5, 2009.
David M. Foster of Arlington, an antitrust lawyer with Fulbright & Jaworski in Washington, D.C. and former Arlington County school board chair ran for the Republican nomination but lost the convention vote to Cuccinelli.

General election results

Polling

General election

House of Delegates

Special elections
81st district (Virginia Beach, Chesapeake) – fifth-term Republican Terrie Suit, chair of the General Laws committee, resigned on October 12, 2008 to take a job as a lobbyist. A special election was set for January 6, 2009. Barry Knight, a hog farmer and member of the Virginia Beach Planning Commission, was selected as the Republican nominee in a firehouse primary on November 29, 2008. On December 4, the Democrats nominated John LaCombe, a 24-year-old payday lending activist. Knight won the special election by an 83-17 margin.
70th district (Richmond, Henrico and Chesterfield Counties) – Dwight Clinton Jones, a Democrat in his eighth term, was elected mayor of Richmond on November 4, 2008. This special election was also scheduled for January 6, 2009. On December 6, 2008, the Democratic Party nominated Delores McQuinn, a member of Richmond City Council, for the seat. McQuinn was unopposed in the special election.
46th district (Alexandria, Fairfax County) – Brian Moran resigned his seat December 12, 2008 to concentrate on his campaign for governor. A special election was called for January 13, 2009. Both major parties held nominating caucuses on December 16, 2008. The Democratic nominee was Charniele Herring, an attorney from Alexandria. The Republicans nominated Joe Murray, an aide to U. S. Representative Joe Wilson of South Carolina. Herring won the election by 16 votes; the House, under Republican control, refused to seat her pending a recount requested by Murray. Herring was finally seated after a recount on January 26.

Retirements
, ten House members had announced they would not run for re-election:
Albert C. Eisenberg (D-Arlington) on January 22
Frank D. Hargrove, Sr. (R-Hanover) on January 26
Jeffrey M. Frederick (R-Woodbridge) on February 13.
Kenneth R. Melvin (D-Portsmouth) on February 24
William H. Fralin, Jr. (R-Roanoke) on February 28
Clarke N. Hogan (R-Halifax) on March 9.
Former Minority Leader Franklin P. Hall (D-Richmond) on March 28. Hall announced his retirement effective April 14, 2009. Governor Kaine immediately announced Hall's appointment to the state Alcoholic Beverage Control Board, effective the same date
Steve Shannon (D-Fairfax) is the Democratic nominee for attorney general.
Kris Amundson (D-Fairfax) announced her retirement on June 24, 2009
Chris Saxman (R-Staunton) announced his retirement on July 17, 2009
In addition, Bob Hull (D-Fairfax) was defeated for renomination by Kaye Kory in the June 9 primary.

Notes

References
Code of Virginia, Title 24.2 – Elections
Virginia State Board of Elections: 2009 Election Calendar; for all offices elected in November

External links
Voter resources
Virginia Voter Registration Form - Deadline to register is Monday, October 5
Voter Registration Information - Find out if you are registered at the Election and Registration Information System
Polling Place Search
Imagine Election - Find out about the people on your ballot, based on your zip code
Virginia Public Access Project - Campaign finance information about candidates, committees, donors, etc.
Campaign websites
Creigh Deeds for Governor - Democratic
Bob McDonnell for Governor - Republican
Bill Bolling for Lieutenant Governor - Republican
Jody Wagner for Lieutenant Governor - Democratic
Ken Cuccinelli for Attorney General - Republican
Steve Shannon for Attorney General - Democratic

 
Virginia